In category theory, the notion of final functor (resp. initial functor) is a generalization of the notion of final object (resp. initial object) in a category.

Note that an object d ∈ Ob(D) is a final object in the usual sense if and only if the functor  is a final functor as defined here.

The notion of initial functor is defined as above, replacing final by initial and colimit by limit.

References
.
.
.

See also 
 http://ncatlab.org/nlab/show/final+functor

Functors